In enzymology, a pterocarpin synthase is an enzyme that catalyzes the chemical reaction

medicarpin + NADP+ + H2O  vestitone + NADPH + H+

The 3 substrates of this enzyme are medicarpin, NADP+, and H2O, whereas its 3 products are vestitone, NADPH, and H+.

This enzyme belongs to the family of oxidoreductases, specifically those acting on the CH-OH group of donor with NAD+ or NADP+ as acceptor. The systematic name of this enzyme class is medicarpin:NADP+ 2'-oxidoreductase. This enzyme is also called pterocarpan synthase. This enzyme participates in isoflavonoid biosynthesis.

References 

 

EC 1.1.1
NADPH-dependent enzymes
Enzymes of unknown structure
Isoflavonoids metabolism